
Gmina Trzciel is an urban-rural gmina (administrative district) in Międzyrzecz County, Lubusz Voivodeship, in western Poland.

The gmina contains part of the protected area called Pszczew Landscape Park.

Villages
Apart from the town of Trzciel, Gmina Trzciel contains the villages and settlements of Bieleń, Brójce, Chociszewo, Jabłonka, Jasieniec, Łagowiec, Lutol Mokry, Lutol Suchy, Nowy Świat, Panowice, Rybojady, Siercz, Sierczynek, Smolniki, Stary Dwór, Świdwowiec and Żydowo.

Neighbouring gminas
Gmina Trzciel is bordered by the gminas of Miedzichowo, Międzyrzecz, Pszczew, Świebodzin, Szczaniec, Zbąszyń and Zbąszynek.

Twin towns – sister cities

Gmina Trzciel is twinned with:
 Asendorf, Germany
 Brójce, Poland
 Falkenberg, Germany

References

Trzciel
Międzyrzecz County